Fluminense Futebol Clube, commonly known as Fluminense, is a Brazilian football club based in Araguari, Minas Gerais state.

History
The club was founded on January 10, 1942, adopting the same name, kits and colors as Fluminense Football Club of Rio de Janeiro city.

Stadium
Fluminense Futebol Clube play their home games at Estádio Sebastião César. The stadium has a maximum capacity of 8,000 people.

References

Association football clubs established in 1942
Football clubs in Minas Gerais
1942 establishments in Brazil